New York City is home to hundreds of cultural institutions and historic sites, many of which are internationally known. This list contains the most famous or well-regarded organizations, based on their mission.

Museums
Also included are non-profit art galleries, arts centers and cultural centers with galleries.

 See List of museums in New York City for a complete sortable list in alphabetical order.
 See List of museums in New York for museums in the rest of New York state.

Encyclopedic

Region and tradition

African and African American

Asian and Asian American

Indigenous and African Caribbean in Latin America

European Jewish and Jewish American

Western by era

Traditional European art

Modern art

Other Western and Native American

Artistic medium

Books, drawings, illustrations, prints

Photography, film, new media

Sculpture

Design, decorative arts, architecture

Entertainment

Performing arts

Amusements

Science

History

American history, local history, historic monuments

Military, police, fire

Transportation and maritime

Financial

Historic houses

Children's

Contemporary spaces

Contemporary museums

Contemporary galleries

Neighborhood art centers

Miscellaneous

Defunct museums
American Museum of Immigration, Liberty Island
Barnum's American Museum, Manhattan
Chelsea Art Museum, Manhattan, closed in 2011
Con Edison Energy Museum, Manhattan
Choco-Story New York, 2017-2019
Discovery Times Square Exposition, closed in 2016
Fisher Landau Center, Long Island City, closed in 2017
Forbes Galleries, closed in 2014
Ground Zero Museum Workshop, history of the September 11 attacks and the workers at the World Trade Center site. Status unknown after 2014
Guggenheim Soho, Manhattan
Kurdish Library and Museum, Brooklyn, collections now owned by Binghamton University
Met Breuer, building turned over to the Frick for temporary use. 
MICRO Museum, Brooklyn, closed exhibit space
Morbid Anatomy Museum, Brooklyn, closed in 2016
Museum of the American Piano, Manhattan, website
Museum of Biblical Art, closed in 2015
Museum of Comic and Cartoon Art, closed in 2012, collections now part of the Society of Illustrators
Museum of Primitive Art, closed in 1976, collections now part of the Metropolitan Museum of Art
National Museum of Catholic Art and History, closed in 2010
New York Jazz Museum, Manhattan
New York Tattoo Museum
Onassis Cultural Center
Rock and Roll Hall of Fame Annex, opened in Soho in 2008, closed in 2010
Sony Wonder Technology Lab, closed in 2016
Sports Museum of America, Manhattan, opened in 2008, closed in 2009
9/11 Tribute Museum, Manhattan, opened in 2006. Closed its physical location in 2022.

Proposed museums
Climate Museum
Museum of Food and Drink
Museum of the Street

Zoos and gardens

Bronx Zoo
Brooklyn Botanic Garden
Central Park Zoo
Community gardens in New York City
Jamaica Bay Wildlife Refuge
New York Aquarium
New York Botanical Garden
Prospect Park Zoo
Queens Botanical Garden
Queen Elizabeth II September 11th Garden (formerly the British Garden) 
Queens Zoo
Queens County Farm Museum
Staten Island Botanical Garden
The New York Chinese Scholar's Garden
Staten Island Zoo
Wave Hill

Performing arts

Lincoln Center

Alice Tully Hall
David Geffen Hall, formerly known as Avery Fisher Hall, home of the New York Philharmonic
David H. Koch Theater, formerly known as the New York State Theater, home to New York City Ballet
Film Society of Lincoln Center
Jazz at Lincoln Center
The Juilliard School
Metropolitan Opera
New York Public Library for the Performing Arts
Vivian Beaumont Theater

Music
Bargemusic
Brooklyn Academy of Music
Brooklyn Symphony Orchestra
Carnegie Hall
City Parks Foundation
Kaufman Music Center
Manhattan School of Music
Mannes College of Music
New York City Opera
The New York Pops
Symphony Space

Theaters
92nd Street Y
Apollo Theater
Samuel J. Friedman Theatre - formerly the Biltmore Theatre
The Billie Holiday Theatre
Bowery Ballroom
Hammerstein Ballroom
La MaMa Experimental Theatre Club
New York City Center
The Public Theater
Radio City Music Hall
Roundabout Theatre Company
Skirball Center for the Performing Arts 
Snug Harbor Cultural Center
The Town Hall
Williamsburg Art & Historical Center

Historically significant sites

Historic House Trust

Most of the following are Registered Historic Places covered in the county lists.

Alice Austen House Museum
Bartow-Pell Mansion Museum
 The Conference House
Dyckman Farmhouse Museum
Edgar Allan Poe Cottage
Gracie Mansion
Hendrick I. Lott House
Historic Richmond Town
King Manor Museum
Kingsland Homestead, with "weeping beech tree"
Lefferts Historic House
Lewis H. Latimer House
The Little Red Lighthouse
Merchant's House Museum
Morris-Jumel Mansion
The Old Stone House
Queens County Farm Museum
Seguine Mansion
Swedish Cottage Marionette Theatre
Valentine-Varian House
Van Cortlandt House Museum
The Wyckoff Farmhouse Museum

National Parks of New York Harbor

Despite its name, National Parks of New York Harbor does not oversee any national parks proper.
African Burial Ground National Monument
Castle Clinton National Monument
Federal Hall National Memorial
Fort Wadsworth
General Grant National Memorial
Governors Island/Governors Island National Monument
Hamilton Grange National Memorial
Statue of Liberty National Monument (including Ellis Island, Statue of Liberty)
Theodore Roosevelt Birthplace National Historic Site

World Trade Center site

International Freedom Center
National September 11 Memorial & Museum
Tribute in Light

Other historic sites
Brooklyn Navy Yard, building 92
Fort Schuyler
Lower East Side Tenement Museum
Irish Hunger Memorial
Trinity Churchyard
Weeksville Heritage Center

Libraries

Biblioteca Instituto Cervantes
Brooklyn Public Library
Central Library
List of Brooklyn Public Library branches
Columbia University Libraries
Arthur W. Diamond Law Library
Avery Architectural and Fine Arts Library
Butler Library
C.V. Starr East Asian Library
Gottesman Libraries
Rare Book & Manuscript Library
Cloisters Library and Archives
Cooper-Hewitt, National Design Museum
Dag Hammarskjöld Library
Elmer Holmes Bobst Library at New York University
Frick Art Reference Library
The Morgan Library & Museum
New York Public Library 
Andrew Heiskell Braille and Talking Book Library
Bronx Library Center
New York Public Library for the Performing Arts
New York Public Library Main Branch
Science, Industry and Business Library
Schomburg Center for Research in Black Culture
List of New York Public Library branches
New York Academy of Medicine Library
New York Society Library
Queens Public Library
List of Queens Public Library branches
Shevchenko Scientific Society

See also 
 Cultural Institutions Group
 List of museums in New York
 List of university art museums and galleries in New York State
 Museum Mile, New York City
 Tourist attractions in New York City

References

External links 

 Directory of Special Libraries and Information Centers (Gale)

New York City museums and cultural institutions

Museums and cultural institutions
 Museums and cultural institutions
New York City museums and cultural institutions
New York City